Constance Clara Garnett (19 December 1861 – 17 December 1946) was an English translator of nineteenth-century Russian literature. She was the first English translator to render numerous volumes of Anton Chekhov's work into English and the first to translate almost all of Fyodor Dostoevsky's fiction into English. She also rendered works by Ivan Turgenev, Leo Tolstoy, Nikolai Gogol, Ivan Goncharov, Alexander Ostrovsky, and Alexander Herzen into English. Altogether, she translated 71 volumes of Russian literature, many of which are still in print today.

Life
Garnett was born in Brighton, England, the sixth of the eight children of the solicitor David Black (1817–1892), afterwards town clerk and coroner, and his wife, Clara Maria Patten (1825–1875), daughter of painter George Patten. Her brother was the mathematician Arthur Black, and her sister was the labour organiser and novelist Clementina Black. Her father became paralysed in 1873, and two years later her mother died from a heart attack after lifting him from his chair to his bed.

She was initially educated at Brighton and Hove High School. Afterwards she studied Latin and Greek at Newnham College, Cambridge, on a government scholarship. In 1883 she moved to London, where she started work as a governess, and then as the librarian at the People's Palace Library. Through her sister, Clementina, she met Dr. Richard Garnett, then the Keeper of Printed Materials at the British Museum, and his son Edward Garnett, whom she married in Brighton on 31 August 1889. Edward, after working as a publisher's reader for T. Fisher Unwin, William Heinemann, and Duckworth, went on to become a reader for the publisher Jonathan Cape. In the summer of 1891, then pregnant with her only child, she was introduced by Edward to the Russian exile Feliks Volkhovsky, who began teaching her Russian. He also introduced her to his fellow exile and colleague Sergius Stepniak and his wife Fanny. Soon after, Garnett began working with Stepniak, translating Russian works for publication; her first published translations were A Common Story by Ivan Goncharov, and The Kingdom of God is Within You by Leo Tolstoy. The latter was published while she was making her first trip to Russia in early 1894.  After visits to Moscow and Saint Petersburg, she travelled to Yasnaya Polyana where she met Tolstoy; although the latter expressed interest in having her translate more of his religious works, she had already begun working on the novels of Turgenev and continued with that on her return home.  Initially she worked with Stepniak on her translations; after his untimely death in 1895, Stepniak's wife Fanny worked with her. From 1906, her favourite amanuensis was a young Russian woman, Natalie Duddington whom she had met in Russia and in whom she found "real intellectual companionship".

Over the next four decades, Garnett produced English-language versions of dozens of volumes by Tolstoy, Gogol, Goncharov, Dostoyevsky, Turgenev, Ostrovsky, Herzen and Chekhov.

Her son and only child, David Garnett, trained as a biologist and later wrote novels, including the popular Lady into Fox (1922).

By the late 1920s, Garnett was frail and half-blind. She retired from translating after the publication in 1934 of Three Plays by Turgenev. After her husband's death in 1937, she became reclusive. She developed a heart condition, with attendant breathlessness, and in her last years had to walk with crutches. She died at The Cearne, Crockham Hill, Kent, at the age of 84.

Reception and legacy
Constance Garnett translated 71 volumes of Russian literary works, and her translations received acclaim from numerous critics and authors, including Joseph Conrad and D. H. Lawrence. Ernest Hemingway admired her translations of Fyodor Dostoevsky and once told a friend that he was unable to read through Leo Tolstoy's War and Peace "until I got the Constance Garnett translation." Despite some complaints about being outdated, her translations are still being reprinted today (most are now in the public domain).

However, Garnett also has had critics, notably Russian authors Vladimir Nabokov and Joseph Brodsky. Nabokov said that Garnett's translations were "dry and flat, and always unbearably demure." Nabokov's criticism of Garnett, however, should be viewed in light of his publicly stated ideal that the translator must be male. Brodsky criticised Garnett for blurring the distinctive authorial voices of different Russian authors:

The reason English-speaking readers can barely tell the difference between Tolstoy and Dostoyevsky is that they aren't reading the prose of either one. They're reading Constance Garnett.

David Foster Wallace criticized Garnett's translations as 'excruciatingly Victorianish'.

In her translations, she worked quickly, and smoothed over certain small portions for "readability", particularly in her translations of Dostoyevsky. 

Her translations of Ivan Turgenev and Anton Chekhov were well regarded by Rachel May in her study on translating Russian classics, The Translator in the Text: On Reading Russian Literature in English. However, May's study also critiqued Garnett for her tendency of "stylistic homogenizing" that "eras[ed] those idiosyncrasies of narrative voice and dialogue that different authors possessed"  and for making prudish word choices that "tamed [the Russian classics] further." May also analyzed how for decades, Garnett's translations were unquestioningly acclaimed by critics because "she suited the needs of her time so well, that no one knew what questions to ask." 

Kornei Chukovsky respected Garnett for introducing millions of English readers to Russian literature, and praised her translations of Turgenev, stating that they "fully correspond to the originals in tonality," but condemned her other translations, writing that she had reduced Dostoevsky's style into "a safe blandscript: not a volcano, but a smooth lawn mowed in the English manner—which is to say a complete distortion of the original" and that the same criticisms applied to her translation of Tolstoy's The Death of Ivan Ilyich. He concluded that:
[H]er translations of the works of Gogol, Dostoyevsky, and Chekhov have to be done over. All of her translations seem insipid, pale, and—worst of all—trivial... [H]er translations would have been considerably better if they had been submitted at the time to the intense scrutiny of critics... But there was no criticism"

In 1994 Donald Rayfield compared Garnett's translations with the most recent scholarly versions of Chekhov's stories and concluded:
While she makes elementary blunders, her care in unravelling difficult syntactical knots and her research on the right terms for Chekhov's many plants, birds and fish are impressive... Her English is not only nearly contemporaneous to Chekhov's, it is often comparable.

Later translators such as Rosemary Edmonds and David Magarshack continued to use Garnett's translations as models for their own work.

For his Norton Critical Edition of The Brothers Karamazov, Ralph Matlaw based his revised version on her translation. This is the basis for the influential A Karamazov Companion by Victor Terras. Matlaw published an earlier revision of Garnett's translation of the Grand Inquisitor chapter in a volume paired with Notes from Underground.

Selected bibliography

Translations credited to Garnett

Anton Chekhov  (was originally transliterated as "Anton Tchehov")
The Darling and Other Stories London: Chatto & Windus (1916)
The Darling
Critique of The Darling by Leo Tolstoy
Ariadne
Polinka
Anyuta
The Two Volodyas
The Trousseau
The Helpmate
Talent
An Artist's Story
Three Years
The Duel and Other Stories London: Chatto & Windus (1916)
The Duel
Excellent People
Mire
Neighbours
At Home
Expensive Lessons
The Princess
The Chemist's Wife
The Lady with the Dog and Other Stories London: Chatto & Windus (1917)
The Lady with the Dog
A Doctor's Visit
An Upheaval
Ionitch
The Head of the Family
The Black Monk
Volodya
An Anonymous Story
The Husband
The Party and Other Stories London: Chatto & Windus (1917)
The Party
Terror
A Woman's Kingdom
A Problem
The Kiss
Anna on the Neck
The Teacher of Literature
Not Wanted
Typhus
A Misfortune
A Trifle from Life 
The Wife and Other Stories London: Chatto & Windus (1918)
The Wife
Difficult People
The Grasshopper
A Dreary Story
The Privy Councillor
The Man in a Case
Gooseberries
About Love
The Lottery Ticket
The Witch and Other Stories London: Chatto & Windus (1918)
The Witch
Peasant Wives 
The Post
The New Villa
Dreams
The Pipe
Agafya
At Christmas Time
Gusev
The Student
In the Ravine
The Huntsman
Happiness
A Malefactor
Peasants
The Bishop and Other Stories London: Chatto & Windus (1919)
The Bishop
The Letter
Easter Eve
A Nightmare
The Murder
The Steppe
The Chorus Girl and Other Stories London: Chatto & Windus (1920)
The Chorus Girl
Verotchka
My Life
At a Country House
A Father
On the Road
Rothschild's Fiddle
Ivan Matveyitch
Zinotchka
Bad Weather
A Gentleman Friend
A Trivial Incident
Letters of Anton Tchehov to his Family and Friends London: Chatto & Windus (1920)
The Cherry Orchard and Other Plays London: Chatto & Windus (1923)
The Cherry Orchard
Uncle Vanya
The Sea-Gull 
The Bear 
The Proposal
Three Sisters and Other Plays London: Chatto & Windus (1923)
Three Sisters
Ivanov
A Swan-Song
An Unwilling Martyr
The Anniversary
On the High Road
The Wedding

Fyodor Dostoyevsky
The Brothers Karamazov London: Heinemann (1912)
The Idiot London: Heinemann (1913)
The Possessed London: Heinemann (1913; revised to incorporate "Stavrogin's Confession" [the censored chapter "At Tikhon's"], 1923)
Crime and Punishment London: Heinemann (1914)
The House of the Dead London: Heinemann (1915)
The Insulted and Injured London: Heinemann (1915)
A Raw Youth London: Heinemann (1916)
The Eternal Husband and Other Stories London: Heinemann (1917)
The Eternal Husband
The Double
A Gentle Spirit
The Gambler and Other Stories London: Heinemann (1917)
The Gambler
Poor People
The Landlady
White Nights and Other Stories London: Heinemann (1918)
White Nights
Notes from Underground 
A Faint Heart
A Christmas Tree and a Wedding
Polzunkov
A Little Hero
Mr. Prohartchin
An Honest Thief and Other Stories London: Heinemann (1919)
An Honest Thief
Uncle's Dream
A Novel in Nine Letters
An Unpleasant Predicament
Another Man's Wife
The Heavenly Christmas Tree
The Peasant Marey
The Crocodile
Bobok
The Dream of a Ridiculous Man
The Friend of the Family; or, Stepanchikovo and Its Inhabitants and Another Story London: Heinemann (1920)
The Friend of the Family
Nyetochka Nyezvanov

Nikolai Gogol
Dead Souls London: Chatto & Windus (1922)
The Overcoat and Other Stories London: Chatto & Windus (1923) 
The Overcoat
The Carriage
The Nevsky Prospect
A Madman's Diary
The Prisoner
The Nose
The Portrait
Evenings on a Farm Near Dikanka London: Chatto & Windus (1926)
The Government Inspector and Other Plays London: Chatto & Windus (1926)
The Government Inspector
Marriage
The Gamblers
An Official's Morning
A Lawsuit
The Servant's Hall
A Fragment
Mirgorod London: Chatto & Windus (1928)

Ivan Goncharov
A Common Story London: Heinemann (1894)

Alexander Herzen
My Past and Thoughts: The Memoirs of Alexander Herzen London: Chatto & Windus (published in six volumes; 1924-1927)

Alexander Ostrovsky
The Storm  London: Duckworth (1899)

Leo Tolstoy
The Kingdom of God Is Within You London: Heinemann (1894)
Anna Karenina (1901)
The Death of Ivan Ilyitch and Other Stories (1902)
The Death of Ivan Ilyitch
Family Happiness
Polikushka
Two Hussars
The Snowstorm
Three Deaths
War and Peace London: Heinemann (1904)

Ivan Turgenev
A Nest of Gentlefolk London: Heinemann (1894)
Rudin London: Heinemann (1894)
The Diary of a Superfluous Man and Other Stories London: Heinemann (1894)
The Diary of a Superfluous Man
A Tour in the Forest
Yakov Pasinkov
Andrei Kolosov
A Correspondence
A Sportsman's Sketches London: Heinemann (1895)
Fathers and Children London: Heinemann (1895)
On the Eve London: Heinemann (1895)
Smoke London: Heinemann (1896)
Virgin Soil London: Heinemann (1896)
Torrents of Spring London: Heinemann (1897)
A Desperate Character and Other Stories London: Heinemann (1899)
A Desperate Character
A Strange Story
Punin and Baburin
Old Portraits
The Brigadier
Pyetushkov
The Jew and Other Stories London: Heinemann (1899)
The Jew
An Unhappy Girl
The Duellist
Three Portraits
Enough
Three Plays London: Cassell & Company (1934)
A Month in the Country
A Provincial Lady
A Poor Gentleman

See also
 Ann Dunnigan

References
Notes

Sources

Oxford Dictionary of National Biography article by Patrick Waddington, "Garnett , Constance Clara (1861–1946)", September 2004; online edn, May 2006. Retrieved 31 December 2006.

External links

 
 
 
 Translations by Constance Garnett, a list at ibiblio
 

Alumni of Newnham College, Cambridge
English translators
Consametance
People educated at Brighton and Hove High School
Russian–English translators
1861 births
1946 deaths
Translators of Fyodor Dostoyevsky
Translators of Leo Tolstoy
20th-century British women writers
19th-century British women writers
19th-century British writers
People from Brighton
Literary translators